Terasakiella brassicae is a Gram-negative, aerobic and motile bacterium species from the genus of Terasakiella which has been isolated from wastewater.

References

External links
Type strain of Terasakiella brassicae at BacDive -  the Bacterial Diversity Metadatabase

Rhodospirillales
Bacteria described in 2016